Cosmocampus banneri (roughridge pipefish, or Banner's pipefish) is a species of marine fish of the family Syngnathidae. It is found from the Red Sea and Western Indian Ocean to Fiji, the Marshall Islands, and the Ryukyu Islands. It lives in coral reefs at depths of 2-30m, where it can grow to lengths of 5.8 cm. Although little is known about the feeding habits of C. banneri, it is expected to feed on small crustaceans similar to other pipefish. This species is ovoviviparous, with males carrying eggs in a brood pouch until giving birth to live young.

Etymology
The specific name honours Albert Henry Banner (1914-1985), an American carcinologist who was an expert in alpheid shrimps.

References

Further reading

Government of Australia Department of the Environment and Energy
Fishes of Australia

banneri
Marine fish
Taxa named by Earl Stannard Herald
Taxa named by John Ernest Randall
Fish described in 1972